Mahalakshmi Layout or Mahalakshmipura is a neighborhood in northwest Bengaluru, India. It is near Rajajinagara, Basaveshwaranagara and Yeshwanthpura. Together with Nandini Layout, Kurubarahalli and Nagapura, it is one of the biggest residential areas in Bengaluru.

Educational institutions
Mahalakshmi layout has a considerable number of educational institutions, both at the primary/secondary education and higher education level.

The area consists of renowned colleges and colleges.

 BGS World School
 BGS Pre-university College
 BGS Institute of Management
 Basaveshwara Aided High School
 Max Muller Public School
 St. Paul's High School
 SG International Public School

References 

Neighbourhoods in Bangalore